Konstantin Viktorovich Shcherbakov (born 20 March 1997) is a Russian football player.

Club career
He made his debut in the Russian Football National League for FC Spartak-2 Moscow on 21 May 2016 in a game against FC Tom Tomsk.

References

External links
 Profile by Russian Football National League

1997 births
People from Dolgoprudny
Sportspeople from Moscow Oblast
Living people
Association football defenders
Russian footballers
Russia youth international footballers
FC Rotor Volgograd players
FC Shinnik Yaroslavl players
FC Spartak Moscow players
FC Spartak-2 Moscow players
FC Spartak Kostroma players
Russian First League players
Russian Second League players